Rémy Boullé (born 20 June 1988) is French paracanoeist. He represented France at the 2016 and 2020 Summer Paralympics.

Career
Barbosa represented France at the 2016 Summer Paralympics in the men's KL1 event. and finished in fifth place with a time of 52.084.

Boullé again represented France at the 2020 Summer Paralympics in the men's KL1 event and finished with a time of 48.917 and won a bronze medal.

References

External links
 
 

1988 births
Living people
French male canoeists
Paracanoeists at the 2016 Summer Paralympics
Paracanoeists at the 2020 Summer Paralympics
Medalists at the 2020 Summer Paralympics
Paralympic medalists in paracanoe
Paralympic bronze medalists for France
ICF Canoe Sprint World Championships medalists in paracanoe
20th-century French people
21st-century French people